Apla Ta Pragmata (Greek: Απλά Τα Πράγματα; English: Things Are Simple) is the twelfth studio album by Greek artist, Katy Garbi. It was released on 14 December 2001 by Sony Music Greece and certified platinum in a month, but after months received double-platinum certification in Greece, selling over 100,000 units* (50,000^ albums). The album was written by various artists, but the most songs written by Nikos Terzis (ten songs from the first album) and Kostas Tournas (all the second album). It also contains two songs from previous platinum CD single Ti Theloune Ta Matia Sou, the title track and a re-performance of "Kane Ton Logariasmo". Dewar's whiskey was a main sponsor of the album, including sponsorship of the album's platinum certification party. From mid-January 2002, the album was released with other cover page for a few days.

In 2001, double-platinum was the album whose sales exceeded 100,000 units.

Track listing

Singles
The following singles were officially released to radio stations with music videos, except the songs "Otan Se Hreiazomai" and "Kragion". The songs "Pes To (Xana) M' Ena Fili", "Adiko Ke Krima", "Akatallili Agapi" and "Vasi Logikis" were not released as singles, but gained a lot of airplay.

"Apla Ta Pragmata"

After the success of last single "Ti Theloune Ta Matia Sou", released after one year the first single "Apla Ta Pragmata" with music video on 14 December 2001 with the album's release. It marked at number 1 position of the IFPI Singles Chart for a lot of weeks. The music video directed by Giorgos Gkavalos and is shot using chroma key with a motion background of a computer generated futuristic city and shows Katy dressed in a variety of outfits. As part of Dewar's Whiskey 2002 Greece campaign, the whiskey company sponsored the release of the following final two music videos via product placement.

"Otan Se Hreiazomai"

"Otan Se Hreiazomai" was the second single and released on 8 February 2002 and had a success airplay.

"Viastika"

"Viastika" was the third single and gained massive success. It spawned a popular music video directed by Kostas Kapetanidis, in which portrays Katy's struggle to rid herself of her memories, thereby she drives a car through a tall stack of forty-five televisions each displaying a different recollection from her memory. As a result of the collision the televisions crash to the ground and would make its debut on MAD TV on 23 March 2002. The video clip produced a marked contrast with the lyrics that speak about emotions of frustration, anger, tiredness and regret, while the video portrays a more rigid and self-confident Katy.

"Thelo Apopse Na Horepso"

"Thelo Apopse Na Horepso" was the fourth single and released on 17 May 2002. It is a catchy tsifteteli with a distinct modern laiko feel and did make its way onto the Billboard singles charts, and became quite successful. Directed by Kostas Kapetanidis, it would coincide with Katy's winter collaboration at Club Iera Odos with Paschalis Terzis, so Kapetanidis decided he would showcase her performance of song within the atmosphere of Club Iera Odos. It also debuted on MAD TV.

"Kragion"

"Kragion" was the fifth and last single and released on 14 June 2002 and had good airplay.

Credits 
Credits adapted from liner notes.

Personnel 

 Antonis Andreou – trombone (tracks: 1-18)
 Hakan Bingolou – oud, säz (tracks: 1-10, 2-4)
 Giannis Bithikotsis – bouzouki, cura, baglama (tracks: 1-4, 1-14, 2-1, 2-3, 2-8)
 Victoria Chalkiti – backing vocals (tracks: 1-2, 1-4, 1-5, 1-7, 1-9, 1-12, 1-18)
 Nikos Chatzopoulos – violin (tracks: 1-2, 1-3, 2-4)
 Vasilis Diamantis – clarinet (tracks: 2-7)
 Akis Diximos – second vocal (tracks: 1-4, 1-6, 1-9, 1-10, 1-13, 1-14, 1-16, 2-1, 2-3, 2-7, 2-8)
 Kostas Doxas – amane vocals (tracks: 1-17)
 Giorgos Fotopoulos – drums (tracks: 2-13)
 Vasilis Gkinos – orchestration, programming, keyboards (tracks: 1-1, 1-3, 1-6, 1-10, 1-11, 1-13, 1-16, 2-2, 2-4, 2-5, 2-9)
 Stelios Goulielmos – backing vocals (tracks: 1-2, 1-4, 1-5, 1-7, 1-9, 1-18)
 Antonis Gounaris – orchestration, programming (tracks: 1-17, 2-1, 2-3, 2-6, 2-7, 2-8) / guitars (tracks: 1-17, 2-1, 2-3, 2-7, 2-8) / cura (tracks: 2-7)
 Vasilis Iliadis – säz (tracks: 1-8)
 Anna Ioannidou – backing vocals (tracks: 1-2, 1-4, 1-5, 1-7, 1-9, 1-15, 1-18)
 Katerina Kiriakou – backing vocals (tracks: 1-1, 1-3, 1-11, 1-17, 2-2, 2-5, 2-9, 2-12)
 Paola Komini – backing vocals (tracks: 1-1, 1-3, 1-11, 1-17, 2-2, 2-5, 2-9, 2-12)
 Spiros Kontakis – orchestration (tracks: 2-13) / guitars (tracks: 1-6, 1-10, 1-11, 1-13, 1-16, 2-2, 2-13)
 Giorgos Kostoglou – bass (tracks: 1-2, 1-4, 1-6, 1-9, 1-10, 1-11, 1-13, 1-14, 1-16, 2-1, 2-2, 2-3, 2-8)
 Antonis Koulouris – drums (tracks: 1-2, 1-4, 1-6, 1-9, 1-10, 1-11, 1-13, 1-14, 1-16, 2-1, 2-2, 2-3, 2-8)
 Stavros Lantsias – orchestration, programming, keyboards (tracks: 2-11)
 Alex Panagi – backing vocals (tracks: 1-1, 1-3, 1-11, 1-17, 2-2, 2-5, 2-9, 2-12)
 Christos Pertsinidis – guitars (tracks: 1-2, 1-4, 1-5, 1-7, 1-9, 1-14)
 Pimis Petrou – orchestration, programming, keyboards (tracks: 2-6, 2-10) / backing vocals (tracks: 2-6)
 Nikos Sakellarakis – trumpet (tracks: 1-18)
 Soumka – programming, keyboards (tracks: 2-13)
 Panagiotis Stergiou – bouzouki (tracks: 1-6, 1-11, 1-16) / cura (tracks: 1-6, 1-9, 1-13, 1-16) / baglama (tracks: 1-6, 1-16)
 Nikos Terzis – orchestration, keyboards (tracks: 1-2, 1-4, 1-5, 1-7, 1-8, 1-9, 1-12, 1-14, 1-15, 1-18)
 Kostas Tournas – orchestration, programming, keyboards (tracks: 2-12)
 Fanis Tsirakis –  programming (tracks: 1-2, 1-4, 1-5, 1-7, 1-8, 1-9, 1-12, 1-14, 1-15, 1-18)
 Dimitris Tsopanellis – guitars (tracks: 2-11)
 Thanasis Vasilopoulos – clarinet (tracks: 1-10) / ney (tracks: 2-4)
 Barry Zealey – bass (tracks: 2-13)
 Dimitris Zogkas – keyboards (tracks: 1-17, 2-1, 2-3, 2-6, 2-7, 2-8, 2-10, 2-12)

Production 

 Takis Argiriou (111 studio) – sound engineer (tracks: 1-1, 1-3, 1-6, 1-10, 1-11, 1-13, 1-16, 1-17) / mix engineer (tracks: 1-1, 1-3, 1-6, 1-10, 1-11, 1-13, 1-16, 1-17, 2-2, 2-4, 2-5, 2-9)
 Christos Avdelas (C&C studio) – sound engineer, mix engineer (tracks: 2-13)
 Thodoris Chrisanthopoulos (Fabelsound) – mastering
 Giannis Doulamis – production manager
 Kostas Giannakopoulos (City studio) – mix engineer (tracks: 2-11)
 Al Giga – styling
 Vaggelis Kiris – photographer
 Dimitris Malegkas (City studio) – sound engineer (tracks: 2-11)
 Lefteris Neromiliotis (Sofita studio) – sound engineer, mix engineer (tracks: 1-2, 1-4, 1-5, 1-7, 1-8, 1-9, 1-12, 1-14, 1-15, 1-18)
 Dimitris Rekouniotis – art direction
 Christos Peltekis (City studio) – sound engineer, mix engineer (tracks: 2-6, 2-12)
 Katerina Sideridou – cover processing
 Soumka (C&C studio) – sound engineer, mix engineer (tracks: 2-13)
 Giannis Tountas (City studio) – sound engineer (tracks: 2-1, 2-3, 2-6, 2-7, 2-8, 2-10, 2-11, 2-12) / mix engineer (tracks: 2-1, 2-3, 2-6, 2-7, 2-8, 2-10, 2-12)
 Stefanos Vasilakis – hair styling
 Manos Vynichakis – make up

Charts 
Apla Ta Pragmata made its debut at number 1 on the 'Top 50 Greek Albums' charts by IFPI.

In a month, it was certified platinum and later was certified double-platinum according to sales.

Accolades 
Apla Ta Pragmata received an award for Best Modern Laiko Singer (alongside Natasa Theodoridou) at the Arion Music Awards 2002.

References 

2001 albums
Katy Garbi albums
Sony Music Greece albums
Greek-language albums